Natalia Villarreal Pardo (born 19 March 1998), known as Natalia Villarreal, is a Mexican professional footballer who currently plays as a midfielder for UANL, in the Liga MX Femenil.

Playing career

Club

Tigres UANL, 2017–present 
During a match in December 2017 against Guerreras del Santos Laguna, Villarreal's last-minute goal led Tigres to set a league record for most goals scored by a team in a single match lifting the team to a 6–0 win.

International
Villarreal represented Mexico at the 2014 FIFA U-17 Women's World Cup in Costa Rica and the 2016 FIFA U-20 Women's World Cup in Papua New Guinea. In December 2017, she was called up by Christopher Cuellar for the 2018 CONCACAF Women's U-20 Championship in Trinidad and Tobago.

Honors and awards

Club
UANL
Liga MX Femenil: Clausura 2018
Liga MX Femenil: Clausura 2019

International
Mexico U17
 CONCACAF Women's U-17 Championship: 2013

Mexico U20
 CONCACAF Women's U-20 Championship: 2018

References

External links
 
 

1998 births
Living people
Mexican women's footballers
Footballers from Nuevo León
Sportspeople from Monterrey
Liga MX Femenil players
Tigres UANL (women) footballers
Women's association football midfielders
Mexican footballers